Stéphane Jobard (born 21 February 1971) is a French professional football coach and former player who works as an assistant coach for Saudi Professional League club Al Nassr, under the direction of head coach Rudi Garcia. As a player, he was a midfielder.

Playing career
Born in Langres, Jobard played club football for Cercle Dijon and Dijon.

Coaching career
Jobard worked as manager of Dijon B and as an assistant manager at Dijon. He left the club in 2018 after being accused of theft, and became an assistant manager of Marseille, before returning to Dijon as manager in June 2019. He was sacked by the club in November 2020.

On 15 December 2021, Jobard was hired by Championnat National club Boulogne. He left the club in May 2022. He would go on to join Saudi Professional League club Al Nassr as an assistant coach later that year, working under the direction of head coach Rudi Garcia.

References

1971 births
Living people
People from Langres
Sportspeople from Haute-Marne
French footballers
Association football midfielders
Dijon FCO players
Championnat National players
Ligue 2 players
French football managers
Dijon FCO non-playing staff
Olympique de Marseille non-playing staff
Dijon FCO managers
Ligue 1 managers
US Boulogne managers
Championnat National managers
Footballers from Grand Est
Al Nassr FC non-playing staff
French expatriate football managers
Expatriate football managers in Saudi Arabia
French expatriate sportspeople in Saudi Arabia